Helen Gross (born Hellen R. Gross, May 1896 – unknown) was an American classic female blues singer, active as a recording artist in the mid-1920s. Songs she recorded include "I Wanna Jazz Some More", "Bloody Razor Blues", and "Strange Man".

All of her recorded work was from sessions in her birthplace, New York City, between May 1924 and March 1925. She recorded 27 songs, which were originally released by Ajax Records. Steve Leggett, writing for AllMusic, noted that her recordings include "a preponderance of often baffling noise effects, which at times gives her songs the feel of a carnival sideshow."

Little is known of her life outside music, and no details of her death are recorded.

Career
Gross recorded for Ajax Records, as did Rosa Henderson, Edna Hicks, Viola McCoy, Monette Moore, and Fletcher Henderson.

Her work was notable for the quality of the jazz musicians that accompanied her, including the trumpet and cornet players James "Bubber" Miley and Louis Metcalf, the stride piano player Cliff Jackson, the pianists Lou Hooper and Porter Grainger, and the saxophonist and clarinetist Bob Fuller.

Gross was not a conventional blues singer. She approached her work as a vaudeville performer. Her arrangements reinforced this style, giving an unusual approach to standard blues material. The results were sketchy, but the AllMusic critic Steve Leggett noted that, on "Haunted House Blues", "Gross sounds as if she's wandered into a carnival funhouse.... The same technique of using goofy Halloween sound effects makes the similar-sounding "Ghost Walking Blues" work wonderfully, however, with just the right balance between odd and eerie." A more sinister element is evident on "Bloody Razor Blues", with lyrics by Spencer Williams, including "I want to bleed him until his heart runs dry."

Her 1924 rendition of "I Wanna Jazz Some More" became notable because of songwriter Tom Delaney's rhyming line of "Miss Susan Green from New Orleans." Joe Davis worked in an A&R capacity, placing artists and songs with Ajax, including Gross and some of Delaney's work.

Discography
Helen Gross: In Chronological Order 1924–25 (1996). Document Records

See also
List of classic female blues singers

References

External links
Ajax Records discography
Document Records illustrated discography at Wirz.de

1896 births
People from Manhattan
Year of death missing
Place of death missing
African-American women singers
American blues singers
Classic female blues singers
Ajax Records artists